The 2012–13 Robert Morris Colonials men's basketball team represented Robert Morris University during the 2012–13 NCAA Division I men's basketball season. The Colonials, led by third year head coach Andrew Toole, played their home games at the Charles L. Sewall Center and were members of the Northeast Conference. They finished the season 24–11, 14–4 in NEC play to be regular season NEC champions. They lost in the semifinals of the Northeast Conference tournament to Mount St. Mary's. As a regular season conference champion who failed to win their conference tournament, they earned an automatic bid to the 2013 NIT where they hosted and defeated Kentucky in the first round before losing in the second round at Providence.

Roster

Schedule

|-
!colspan=9|Regular Season

|-
!colspan=9| 2013 Northeast Conference men's basketball tournament

|-
!colspan=9| 2013 NIT

References

Robert Morris Colonials men's basketball seasons
Robert Morris
Robert Morris
Robert
Robert